Manhattan Beach is a small city in Crow Wing County, Minnesota, United States, near Crosslake. The population was 57 at the 2010 census. It is part of the Brainerd Micropolitan Statistical Area.

History
Manhattan Beach was incorporated in June 1941.

Geography
It is along County Road 1 near County Road 66.

Demographics

2010 census
As of the census of 2010, there were 57 people, 25 households, and 17 families living in the city. The racial makeup of the city was 98.2% White and 1.8% Native American. Hispanic or Latino of any race were 1.8% of the population.

There were 25 households, of which 20.0% had children under the age of 18 living with them, 52.0% were married couples living together, 8.0% had a female householder with no husband present, 8.0% had a male householder with no wife present, and 32.0% were non-families. 12.0% of all households were made up of individuals, and 4% had someone living alone who was 65 years of age or older. The average household size was 2.28 and the average family size was 2.53.

The median age in the city was 53.2 years. 17.5% of residents were under the age of 18; 3.6% were between the ages of 18 and 24; 21% were from 25 to 44; 31.6% were from 45 to 64; and 26.3% were 65 years of age or older. The gender makeup of the city was 50.9% male and 49.1% female.

2000 census
As of the census of 2000, there were 50 people, 22 households, and 15 families living in the city. The racial makeup of the city was 100.00% White.

There were 22 households, out of which 9.1% had children under the age of 18 living with them, 68.2% were married couples living together, and 27.3% were non-families. 18.2% of all households were made up of individuals, and 9.1% had someone living alone who was 65 years of age or older. The average household size was 2.27 and the average family size was 2.44.

In the city, the population was spread out, with 14.0% under the age of 18, 10.0% from 18 to 24, 10.0% from 25 to 44, 36.0% from 45 to 64, and 30.0% who were 65 years of age or older. The median age was 52 years. For every 100 females, there were 117.4 males. For every 100 females age 18 and over, there were 115.0 males.

The median income for a household in the city was $51,250, and the median income for a family was $52,292. Males had a median income of $47,500 versus $31,875 for females. The per capita income for the city was $29,268. None of the population and none of the families were below the poverty line.

Politics

References

External links
City Website

Cities in Minnesota
Cities in Crow Wing County, Minnesota
Brainerd, Minnesota micropolitan area